The 2014–15 Ottawa Senators season was the 23rd season of the Ottawa Senators of the National Hockey League (NHL). After an eventful regular season, the team returned to the NHL playoffs after not qualifying in the 2013–14 NHL season. Since 1996, the team has not missed the playoffs in consecutive seasons.

With the team at .500 in early December, general manager Bryan Murray fired head coach Paul MacLean, replacing him with assistant coach  Dave Cameron. After being 14 points out of a playoff spot at the start of February, the Senators rallied behind the outstanding play of call-up goaltender Andrew Hammond down the stretch and qualified for the playoffs in the last game of the regular season. For his play, Hammond, nicknamed the "Hamburglar", gained league-wide attention, being named as an NHL Star of the Month and Week. Two rookies had outstanding seasons. Mark Stone who was nominated for the Calder Memorial Trophy, tied for the lead in points among rookies and Mike Hoffman led all rookies in goal scoring. First-year captain Erik Karlsson led the team in scoring with 66 points and won the James Norris Memorial Trophy as the league's top defenceman.

In the playoffs, the Senators played the Montreal Canadiens in the first round of the playoffs. It was a rematch of the 2013 series which the Senators won. The Senators fell behind 3–0 in the series before rallying back with two wins. However, the comeback fell short and the Senators were eliminated in six games. Hammond started the series but was replaced in the third game by the Senators' number one goalie Craig Anderson, who was outstanding in his return to play.

Before the season, it was learned that Murray had cancer, for which he underwent treatment weekly during the season, although he continued in his duties as general manager. In March 2015, it was learned that assistant coach Mark Reeds also had cancer. Reeds died on the eve of the playoffs, and the team dedicated their play to Reeds. Owner Eugene Melnyk was too ill to attend the playoffs and received a liver transplant in May 2015 after a public appeal for donors.

Off-season
On May 11, 2014, it was reported that the Senators were looking to trade captain Jason Spezza, who has one year remaining on his current contract, prior to the 2014 NHL Entry Draft. Spezza was traded on July 1 to the Dallas Stars, along with Ludwig Karlsson for Alex Chiasson, Alex Guptill, Nick Paul and a 2015 draft second-round pick. Milan Michalek re-signed with the Senators on the same day, for a three-year extension. On July 4, free agent David Legwand signed with the Senators on a two-year deal. On July 7, the team issued a statement that general manager Bryan Murray had been diagnosed with an undisclosed form of cancer and will undergo treatment immediately. Assistant general managers Pierre Dorion and Randy Lee will manage hockey operations when Murray is undergoing treatment.

On August 18, 2014, TSN and the Ottawa Senators announced that the team's regional games will be broadcast on a new channel launching on August 25, 2014. The new channel is called TSN5. The channel will broadcast 53 games in the regular season plus preseason games.

On August 19, 2014, the Ottawa Senators announced that the team had surpassed over $100 million in community contributions in Eastern Ontario and Western Quebec. The total includes over $59 million in community projects, over $25 million in contributions to charities and minor hockey programs, and more than $21 million in community programs and in-kind donations.

On September 9, 2014, the Ottawa Senators announced a couple of affiliation agreements. The club announced they've extended their American Hockey League (AHL) affiliation with the Binghamton Senators through the 2018–19 season. The Senators also announced a new ECHL affiliation with the Evansville IceMen through the 2015-16 season.

After some speculation about right winger Bobby Ryan's status entering the final year of his contract, on October 2, 2014, the team re-signed Ryan to a seven-year $50.25 million contract extension. At the same press conference announcing Ryan's signing, it was announced that Erik Karlsson was named team captain, the ninth in the current Senators history.

Regular season 
The team began their season October 9 with a three-game road trip beginning in Nashville taking on the Predators. Their home opener took place one week later on October 16 when they hosted the Colorado Avalanche at the Canadian Tire Centre. The Senators finished the home portion of their schedule on April 7, 2015 against the Pittsburgh Penguins. Their final regular season game took place in Philadelphia when they defeated the Flyers on April 11.

Former long-time Senators captain Daniel Alfredsson signed a one-game contract with Ottawa so he could announce his retirement as a member of the Senators. He was honoured prior to the match on December 4, 2014, where he participated in the pre-game warmup wearing an Ottawa jersey with the captain's insignia, which current captain Erik Karlsson relinquished for the occasion. Alfredsson would in March, receive the "key to the city" of Ottawa from Ottawa Mayor Jim Watson.

Head coach Paul MacLean was fired 27 games into the season. It was 109 games after MacLean won the Jack Adams trophy as NHL Coach of the Year. general manager Bryan Murray elevated assistant coach Dave Cameron to head coach. According to Murray, there was discord among the players. The team was at .500, and Murray expressed the hope that the team had enough games to make run to the playoffs.

In February, both of the Senators' goalies were injured. Craig Anderson injured his hand in practice and Robin Lehner was concussed in a collision with Clarke MacArthur who also received a concussion. Binghamton starting goalie Andrew "Hamburglar" Hammond was elevated to Ottawa. He won his first five starts (his first starts ever in the NHL) and was named NHL First Star for the week of February 23 – March 1. The Senators won three straight games in California, the first time the franchise had done so. The corresponding win streak elevated the Senators into playoff contention for the final wild-card spot. In March, Anderson returned to the lineup and started two games. After losing to Boston, the team the Senators were chasing, coach Cameron returned to starting Hammond, who continued his streak of holding the opposition to two or fewer goals, and the team being undefeated in regulation time with him starting. Hammond became only the third NHL goalie since 1938 to hold the opposition to two or fewer goals for his first twelve career starts. The team continued its run with Hammond and qualified for the playoffs in the final game of the season. The team had been 14 points out of a playoff spot and was the first team in NHL history to overcome that large of a deficit to qualify for the playoffs. They also became the first team not to get shutout in a full regular season since the Buffalo Sabres during the 2006-07 season.

Playoffs 

The Senators qualified for the playoffs after missing them in 2014. It is the fifteenth time in the modern franchise's 23-year history they've gone to the post-season. The Senators finished the regular season on a 23-4-4 run in their final 31 games in order to qualify for the postseason.

Prior to the season, several sports outlets predicted the club would miss the playoffs. According to The Hockey News yearbook, the club's Stanley Cup odds were 95-1, and the club would finish in seventh place in the Atlantic Division. The official NHL 2015 Yearbook predicted the Senators would finish in 13th place in the Eastern Conference. Gambling site Bodog set the expected over/under for points at 78.5. That is 14.5 less points than the final playoff spot in the Eastern Conference the prior season.

First round: Ottawa vs. Montreal
Montreal, which won the Atlantic Division title, had home ice advantage over the Senators, who took the first wild card position. This was a rematch of the 2013 playoff series between the teams won by the Senators. In the 2014–15 regular season series, the Senators won three games of four between the teams.

In game one in Montreal, the Senators started rookie goaltender Andrew Hammond for his first NHL career playoff start. An own goal by Andrei Markov was the only scoring of the first period, giving Ottawa a 1–0 lead after the period. Montreal scored four times in the second period to take a 4–3 lead. Montreal defender P. K. Subban was ejected from the game for a slashing attempt to injure on Mark Stone, who left the game but returned to play though injured. The third period was scoreless and Montreal took a 1–0 series lead. The next day, the Senators announced Stone suffered a microfracture in his wrist due to the slash. In game two, the Senators again took the lead with a goal in the first period by Clarke MacArthur. In the second period, the Canadiens took the lead on goals by Max Pacioretty and Subban. In the third, the Senators forced it to overtime with a power play goal by Patrick Wiercioch. In overtime, Alex Galchenyuk scored to win the game for the Canadiens.

The series moved to Ottawa for game three, and Ottawa switched goaltenders, substituting Craig Anderson for Hammond, and inserted Chris Neil into the lineup. For the third time in the series, the Senators scored first, in the first period, on a goal by MacArthur. The second period was scoreless. In the third period, Dale Weise scored to tie the game and send it to overtime. In the overtime, Weise scored again to put the Canadiens up in the series 3–0. In game four, the game was scoreless until halfway through the third period when Mike Hoffman scored the only goal of the game and the Senators staved off elimination. Anderson stopped 28 Canadiens shots to record his third career playoff shutout. It was the Senators' first playoff shutout of the Canadiens and the first playoff shutout of Montreal by Ottawa since the first Senators shut out the Canadiens in April 1927 en route to a Stanley Cup title.

The Senators faced elimination again in game five in Montreal. Again, Ottawa took the lead in the first, this time with two goals by Bobby Ryan and Patrick Wiercioch. The Senators increased their lead in the second period with a power play goal by Erik Karlsson to lead by 3–0 after two. In the third, Tom Gilbert scored to narrow the gap to 3–1. Erik Condra made a critical takeaway and scored on a breakaway. After some roughing between Anderson and Brandon Prust led to a Senators power play, Mike Hoffman scored in the final minute to make it a 5–1 romp. In the game, Montreal out shot Ottawa 46–25 but was repeatedly stymied by Anderson.

In game six, Montreal scored first for the first time in the series, on a first period fluke goal by Brendan Gallagher and made it stand up to the end, adding an empty net goal with one second left to win the game 2–0 and take the series. It was the first and only time this season that Ottawa was shut out. A second-period goal by Jean-Gabriel Pageau was called off by the referee who ruled he had lost sight of the puck. The Senators outshot the Canadiens 43–19 but were stymied by Canadiens' goaltender Carey Price.

Standings

Schedule and results

Pre-season

Regular season

Playoffs

Player statistics
Final Stats 
Scoring

Goaltenders

†Denotes player spent time with another team before joining the Senators.  Stats reflect time with the Senators only.
‡No longer with team.
Bold/italics denotes team leader in that category.

Awards and honours

Awards

NHL awards

Milestones

Records

Transactions

Trades

Free agents acquired

Free agents lost

Claimed via waivers

Lost via waivers

Player signings

Suspensions/fines

Draft picks

The 2014 NHL Entry Draft took place on June 27–28, 2014 at the Wells Fargo Center in Philadelphia, Pennsylvania.

Draft notes
Ottawa's first-round pick went to the Anaheim Ducks, as the result of trade on July 5, 2013 that sent Bobby Ryan to Ottawa, in exchange for Jakob Silfverberg, Stefan Noesen and this pick.
Ottawa's fifth-round pick went to the Edmonton Oilers, as the result of a trade on March 5, 2014 that sent Ales Hemsky to Ottawa, in exchange for a third-round pick in 2015, and this pick.
Ottawa's sixth-round pick went to the Minnesota Wild, as the result of a trade on March 12, 2013 that sent Matt Kassian to Ottawa, in exchange for this pick.
 Ottawa traded for the Winnipeg Jets' seventh-round pick, trading a sixth-round pick in the 2015 draft.

References

Ottawa Senators seasons
Ottawa
Ottawa
Ottawa Senators
Ottawa Senators